Pythias was a Greek biologist and embryologist, and the first wife of Aristotle.

Pythias may also refer to:
 Damon and Pythias, characters in Greek mythology
 Pythias (Roman) (1st century AD), Roman slave
 Knights of Pythias, an American fraternal organization and secret society

See also
 Pythius (disambiguation)
 Pytheas (4th century BC), Greek explorer from modern day Marseilles
 Pytheas (crater), a lunar crater
 Pythia, oracle